The radiate ligament connects the anterior part of the head of each rib with the side of the bodies of two vertebrae, and the intervertebral fibrocartilage between them.

It consists of three flat fasciculi, which are attached to the anterior part of the head of the rib, just beyond the articular surface.
 The superior fasciculus ascends and is connected with the body of the vertebra above. 
 The inferior one descends to the body of the vertebra below. 
 The middle one, the smallest and least distinct, is horizontal and is attached to the intervertebral fibrocartilage.

The radiate ligament is in relation, in front, with the thoracic ganglia of the sympathetic trunk, the pleura, and, on the right side, with the azygos vein; behind, with the interarticular ligament and synovial membranes.

In the case of the first rib, this ligament is not divided into three fasciculi, but its fibers are attached to the body of the last cervical vertebra, as well as to that of the first thoracic.

In the articulations of the heads of the tenth, eleventh, and twelfth ribs, each of which articulates with a single vertebra, the triradiate arrangement does not exist; but the fibers of the ligament in each case are connected to the vertebra above, as well as to that with which the rib articulates.

References

....

External links

Ligaments of the torso